The Church of St Mary the Virgin is situated in Beighton, a suburb of the City of Sheffield, England. It is located just off High Street, it is the parish church for the parish of Beighton and a Grade II* listed building. Although the original church dated from the 12th century there is no remaining trace of this original structure, although there are some later Medieval parts (see below). It is dedicated to Mary, the mother of Jesus. The benefice is currently vacant (no minister).

History and architecture
Beighton was mentioned in the Domesday Book of 1086 but there was no reference to any church in the settlement. It is believed that St. Mary's dates from the year  1150, this is based on the discovery of a disintegrating late Norman semi-circular chancel arch which was unearthed during late 19th century repair work. The first documented mention of the church is in an undated deed written during the reign of Edward I (1272-1307). At that time the church was dedicated to Saint Radegund who originated in Thuringia, there is no date for the change of dedication to St Mary and as late as 1557 there was a mention of "the churche yard of V(ir)gyn Radegond at Beghton".

The tower arch is thought to be the oldest part of the present building and may date to the 13th century, while the north aisle dates from the 15th century, there was probably once a chantry chapel at its east end. There was a period of rebuilding and alteration towards the end of the 14th century that saw the addition of a pointed chancel arch and nave arcades. There was further restoration in 1773 but by the 1860s the church was in a dilapidated state and the newly appointed minister the Reverend George Antrobus employed the Chesterfield architect Samuel Rollinson (1827-1891) to oversee an extensive programme of reconstruction and renovation which took place between October 1867 and December 1868. The work included taking down the walls of the chancel and the south aisle and rebuilding them on the original footprint, the Clerestory windows to the nave were removed, and a gallery at the west end of the church was taken down. Bench pews replaced the box pews allowing for the capacity of the church to be increased to 291.

The north door or Devil's door, was blocked up at one time and then later re-opened. The devil's door was left ajar during baptisms to release any evil spirits in the child. On the north side of the chancel are two gravestones, one of these refers to the Jermyns, a wealthy family who owned property in Beighton, Hackenthorpe and Eckington. There is a Hagioscope or squint cut into the wall between the chancel and the nave, this enabled worshippers to see the priest's actions indirectly. Two brasses on the south wall of the nave mark the resting places of William Jessoppe, vicar of Beighton, who died in 1667 and M. Robert Jessoppe of Waterthorp Gent who died in 1753. The rood was designed by Ninian Comper.

In December 2006, Ed Dennison Archaeological Services Ltd were commissioned by the church council to conduct archaeological observations during internal refurbishment of the church and the replacement of the external drainage system. The result of this observation found no evidence of any remaining features connected with the original medieval church. The most noteworthy feature uncovered was the rediscovery of an early stone floor, last recorded in 1816 and buried in the 1867 restoration. The floor is thought to date from the early 16th century.

List of rectors
1316 – Bartholomew de Coryngham		
1349 – Geoffrey de Haddon			
1356 – William de Fereby			
? – Richard de Beuley
1367 – Richard de Raundes			
1374 – Richard de Kyngeston			
1396 – John del More				
1429 – Roger Wyresdale			
1435 – Thomas Wakesley			
1442 – Matthew Lachford			
1456 – William Orwell (Collated by Bishop)
? -  John Tynker (Buried at Beighton 1480)	
1490 - 	Thomas Atkinson			
1535? – Leonard Lynley (d 1538 buried in chancel)
1538 – Thomas Rainshaw
1543 – Ralph Royez				
1557 – William Wordsworth			
? – Nicholas Harvey
1567 – George Harvey				
1603 – John Higdon (d 1613, buried in chancel)
1638 – Edward Haslam				
1640 – John Hunne				
1650 – William Jessop (d 18 April 1667 d at Beighton) Appointed by Parliamentary Commission
1667 – Thomas Goold (Buried at Beighton 1674)	
1674 – Henry Burdyn
1690 – Thomas Jackson				
1703 – Marmaduke Drake (Buried at Beighton 2 December 1741)
1733 -  John Drake				
1745 – John Drake Jnr (Buried at Beighton 7 February 1763) 	
1763 – Thomas Purcell (Buried at Beighton 28 July 1764) 
1764 – Joseph Meller				
1769 – Richard Morton				
1821 – Hon. Thomas Erskine (Buried Beighton 5 January 1859) 
1859 – George Hardolph Eyre			
1865 – George Antrobus (buried at Beight 21 November 1872)	
1872 – Edward Reynolds			
1889 – Robert Stewart Hare			
1911 – Andrew Brown Maughan		
1932 – Paul Basil Honeybourne Ashwin		
1939 – Ernest, Reginald Redfern			
1946 – Harold Pickles				
1957 – William Gilbert Potts			
1964 – Colin Nield				
1969 – Robert Edwin Michael Vickers (d 1 December 1975, Ashes interred at Beighton)
1976 – Alan Roy Billings				
1978 – Alan Gardner Livesley			
1984 – Alan Grenville Richards	
		
Chantry Priests
Richard Ashe (died 1541) was buried in the church.

References
 

12th-century church buildings in England
History of Sheffield
English Gothic architecture in South Yorkshire
Tourist attractions in Sheffield
Grade II* listed buildings in Sheffield
Grade II* listed churches in South Yorkshire
Churches in Sheffield
Church of England church buildings in South Yorkshire